Elias S. Kimball (30 May 1857, Salt Lake City – 13 June 1934) was the first Mormon U.S. Army chaplain and first in any branch of the United States military. He served in the Spanish–American War with the Second Army Corps Volunteer Engineer Regiment after an appointment to the rank of captain by U.S. President William McKinley around June 19, 1898. He was also a businessperson with his older brother, J. Golden Kimball. He was a member of the Utah Territorial legislature (Territorial Assembly) 1888–1889 and Logan, Utah city council 1883–1884. He was a president of the Southern States Mission after his brother J. Golden Kimball, and was named a Seventy by Joseph F. Smith in 1884 and 1894.

References

1857 births
1934 deaths
American leaders of the Church of Jesus Christ of Latter-day Saints
American military personnel of the Spanish–American War
Latter Day Saints from Utah
Members of the Utah Territorial Legislature
People from Salt Lake City
Spanish–American War chaplains
United States Army chaplains
19th-century American clergy